Boguszowice may refer to the following places in Poland:
 Boguszowice, Cieszyn in Silesian Voivodeship (south Poland);
 Boguszowice, former town in Silesian Voivodeship (south Poland), now two districts of Rybnik:
 Boguszowice Osiedle
 Boguszowice Stare